Different for Girls is a 1996 British/French comedy-drama film in which one of the protagonists is a transgender woman. The film is directed by Richard Spence and written by Tony Marchant, starring Steven Mackintosh and Rupert Graves.

Plot
Paul Prentice (Rupert Graves) and Karl Foyle (Steven Mackintosh) were close friends during their secondary school days. Paul used to defend Karl from the violent attacks of their classmates, who ridiculed Karl for being effeminate.

Some years later they are reunited literally by accident, when Paul, on the motorcycle he rides as a courier, runs into the cab that Karl (who has undergone gender confirmation surgery and is named Kim) is riding in. Paul is initially surprised to discover that Karl has become Kim, but asks her out to get re-acquainted.

Their first date goes badly and Kim assumes that it's because Paul is nervous about being seen in public with her. Paul brings her flowers at her workplace (as a verse writer for a greeting card company) and they go out again. This date works out better and they end up back at Paul's place listening to music.

The two continue to spend time together, with Paul teaching Kim how to ride a motorcycle. Their next dinner date, at Kim's place, is disastrous. Paul, struggling to understand transgender issues, drinks too much and ends up in the courtyard outside Kim's apartment, exposing his penis and ranting. The police arrive and arrest him for indecent exposure. Kim places a hand on one of the officers and he arrests her for obstruction. In the police van, one of the officers makes crude remarks about Kim and places his hand under her skirt. Paul intervenes and is beaten by the officer.

At the police station, Paul is charged with assaulting the officer. Kim, his only witness, is terrified of being in trouble and intimidated by the police into keeping silent. She flees to her sister's home.

At Paul's trial on the assault charges, Kim is able to gather her courage and testify for Paul. While he is still convicted, he receives only a token fine. A reporter at the courthouse tries to buy Kim and Paul's story but they refuse. They return to Kim's place, where Paul is surprised and delighted to discover that he and Kim are sexually as well as emotionally compatible; they make love.

Paul, desperate for money following the repossession of his motorcycle, sells Kim's and his story to a London tabloid. With the story splashed all over the papers, Kim thinks she's going to be sacked from the greeting card company. Instead, her boss stands behind her.

As the film draws to a close, it's revealed that Kim and Paul are living together and that it was Kim's idea for Paul to sell the story.

Cast
 Steven Mackintosh as Kim/Karl Foyle
 Rupert Graves as Paul Prentice
 Miriam Margolyes as Pamela
 Saskia Reeves as Jean
 Charlotte Coleman as Alison
 Nisha Nayar as Angela
 Neil Dudgeon as Neil Payne
 Adrian Rawlins as Mike Rendell

Awards and acclaim
 Grand Prix of the Americas Award at the 1996 Montreal World Film Festival
 Critical praise at the Sundance Film Festival

See also
 Boy Meets Girl (2015)
 Transamerica (2005)
 Transgender in film and television

External links
 
 
 

1996 films
1996 comedy films
1996 LGBT-related films
British comedy films
1990s English-language films
English-language French films
British LGBT-related films
French LGBT-related films
Films about trans women
Films scored by Stephen Warbeck
1997 comedy films
1997 films
1990s British films
1990s French films